Won Tae-yeon is a South Korean film director, screenwriter and poet. He is currently working for LOEN Entertainment, a South Korean record label and talent agency.

Filmography

Works 
 넌 가끔가다 내 생각을 하지 난 가끔가다 딴 생각을 해 (1992)
 손 끝으로 원을 그려봐 네가 그릴 수 있는 한 크게 그걸 뺀만큼 널 사랑해 (1993)
 원태연 알레르기 (1994)
 사랑해요 당신이 나를 생각하지 않는 시간에도 (1996)
 사용설명서 (1998)
 Burying The Face in Tears (눈물에 얼굴을 묻는다) (2000) 
 그녀와 나 사이엔 무엇이 있을까 (2000)
 안녕 (2003)

See also
List of Korean film directors
List of Korean-language poets
Cinema of Korea

External links

Living people
1971 births
South Korean film directors
South Korean screenwriters
People from Seoul
Kyung Hee University alumni
Kakao M people
Melon Music Award winners